Mirzapur district is one of the 75 districts in the Indian state of Uttar Pradesh. The district is bounded on the north by Bhadohi and Varanasi districts, on the east by Chandauli district, on the south by Sonbhadra district and on the northwest by Prayagraj. The district occupies an area of 4521 km2. Mirzapur city is the district headquarters. Mirzapur district is a part of Mirzapur division. This district is known for the Vindhyavasini temple in Vindhyachal and several tourist attractions like water falls like Rajdari & Devdari and dams. It consist of several Ghats where historical sculptures are still present. During the Ganges festival these Ghats are decorated with lights and diyas.

It was once the largest district in Uttar Pradesh until Sonbhadra district was separated from Mirzapur in 1989.

Demographics

According to the 2011 census Mirzapur district has a population of 2,496,970, roughly equal to the nation of Kuwait or the US state of Nevada. This gives it a ranking of 174th in India (out of a total of 640). Its population growth rate over the decade 2001-2011 was  17.89%. Mirzapur has a sex ratio of 900 females for every 1000 males, and a literacy rate of 70.38%. Scheduled Castes and Scheduled Tribes made up 26.48% and 0.81% of the population respectively. Female literacy rate here is 54%.

Languages

At the time of the 2011 Census of India, 80.95% of the population in the district spoke Hindi and 18.40% Bhojpuri as their first language.

Bhojpuri language is spoken in the district. Agariya, an Austroasiatic tongue with approximately 70,000 speakers; Awadhi, which has a lexical similarity of 72-91% with Hindi and is spoken by about 7,800,000 in Bagelkhand; and Bagheli, a tongue in the Eastern Hindi group with almost 40,000,000 speakers, written in both the Devanagari and Kaithi scripts.

Administrative divisions
The district consists four Tehsils. These are Mirzapur (Sadar), Chunar, Marihan and Lalganj. These four tehsils are further divided into twelve blocks.

Economy
In 2006 the Ministry of Panchayati Raj named Mirzapur one of the country's 250 most backward districts (out of a total of 640). It is one of the 34 districts in Uttar Pradesh have received funds from the Backward Regions Grant Fund Programme (BRGF). Once tourism used to contribute in the economy but due to lack of care from government officials and local people the unmatched beauty of the places like Sirshe dam and waterfall, Dadri (Pipari) dam, Vindham waterfall, Lower Khajuri, Upper Khajuri, Lakhaniya waterfall, Siddhnath Waterfall, Kotwan-Patehara forest, Fort of Chunar and Dadri-Haliya forest has become 'the stories of past'. Once there was a time when every Sunday of rainy season used to be a fair like atmosphere for the neighbouring localities of Sirshe waterfall and Vindham waterfall due to their attraction of tourist not only from every part of the U.P. and but neighbourhood states too. The separation of the Sonebhadra largely affected the economical condition and after the closing of mills and depression in the carpet industry Mirzapur has become economically disadvantaged.

Education

Colleges
 B.L.J. Inter College
 M.P.M.B. Inter College
 Government Inter College
 Jubilee Inter College
 Arya Kanya Inter College
 K.B. Postgraduate College
 G.D. Binani P.G. College
 Rajiv Gandhi South Campus, BHU
 Maa Vindhyavasini Autonomous State Medical College

Notable people
 Sone Lal Patel, Indian politician.
 Anupriya Patel, Indian politician.
 Amar Goswami, senior journalist and one of the prominent fiction writers of Hindi literature 
 Naheed Abidi, Indian scholar of Sanskrit 
 Lakshmi Raj Sharma, Indian author, novelist, and academician 
 Lalita Shastri, wife of former Prime Minister of India Lal Bahadur Shastri
 Prachi Mishra, Femina Miss India Earth 2012

References

External links

 

 
Districts of Uttar Pradesh